Nurabad (also Romanized as Nūrābād; also known as Nūrābād-e Bāvaleh) is a village in Bavaleh Rural District, in the Central District of Sonqor County, Kermanshah Province, Iran. At the 2006 census, its population was 165, in 40 families.

References 

Populated places in Sonqor County